Ian Spink (born 8 October 1947) is an Australian-British choreographer.

Born in Melbourne, he trained at the Australian Ballet School. After graduating in 1968, he danced and choreographed for The Australian Ballet, Australian Dance Theatre and the Dance Company of New South Wales.

In 1974, he was offered a grant to tour with Merce Cunningham's dance troupes when they toured Australia. He then moved to London in 1977, and has remained in the UK since then. In 1982, Spink co-founded Second Stride along with Siobhan Davies and Richard Alston.

In 1990 he directed the premiere production of Judith Weir's opera The Vanishing Bridegroom for Scottish Opera, subsequently broadcast by BBC TV.

Spink most recently choreographed Petruska for Scottish Ballet at the Edinburgh International Festival. Spink was Artistic Director of citymoves Dance Agency Aberdeen, one of the three Scottish Dance Agencies (2005-2010), and created the Dance Live Festival in 2005 which still continues today.

Spink is now a member of The Work Room, a resource centre for independent choreographers in Glasgow, and works as a director, and as performer with contemporary performance company Airfield.

External links
 Spink at The Work Room
 Spink at Airfield

References

1947 births
Living people
Australian male ballet dancers
Australian choreographers
Australian Ballet School alumni